Kaédi Airport  is an airport serving Kaédi, a city in the Gorgol Region of southern Mauritania.

References

External links
 

Airports in Mauritania
Gorgol Region